Visitors to Saint Kitts and Nevis must obtain a visa unless they come from one of the 104 visa exempt countries.

Cruise ship passengers can visit Saint Kitts and Nevis for up to 24 hours without a visa.

Visa policy map

Visa exemption
As of Right, citizens of the following countries may reside and work indefinitely in Saint Kitts and Nevis without any restrictions:

Citizens of the following countries and territories can visit Saint Kitts and Nevis as tourists without a visa:

1 — up to 6 months for BOTC passport holders of Montserrat, 3 months for other classes of British nationality.

Additionally, the Ministry of Foreign Affairs does not name the following countries on the list of countries that need visas to travel to Saint Kitts and Nevis:

 and  signed visa-waiver agreement.

eVisa
Visitors from countries that require a visa for Saint Kitts and Nevis can apply for an eVisa online. With a printed approval they are issued a visa on arrival by an Immigration Officer for a fee of USD 100. The maximum length of stay is 30 days.

See also

Visa requirements for Saint Kitts and Nevis citizens

References

Saint Kitts and Nevis
Foreign relations of Saint Kitts and Nevis